The MX Designation System was introduced by the Experimental Engineering Section of the US Army Air Corps Materiel Division in 1941. MX designations were used for experimental weapon system programs, including jet- and rocket-powered systems, precision-guided munitions, and other systems designed and manufactured by U.S. defense contractors under contracts provided by the U.S. Army Air Corps from 1941, the United States Army Air Force (1945–1947), and the United States Air Force (1947–1954). Some MX designated programs were also pursued by United States Navy. For example MX-554 led both to the Army JB-2 as well as the Navy KGW. The MX designation system was not used by any other US military organization other than in reference to the USAAC, USAAF and USAF programs.

The "MX" indexation system was in use until July 1, 1954, but certain weapon programs have been referred to by their "MX" designation during their project development since 1954, such as the SM-65 Atlas (MX-1593).

The LGM-118 Peacekeeper was given the project title MX for Missile Experimental but was not part of the MX series of designations as the program did not exist until well after the MX designation system had been discontinued.

References

Further reading

World War II guided missiles of the United States
Cold War missiles of the United States